Caloplaca lucifuga is a species of fungus belonging to the family Teloschistaceae.

It is native to Europe and America.

References

Teloschistales